Sebastian Rocca is a social entrepreneur, an LGBTI rights advocate, and founder of Micro Rainbow International.

Career

Micro Rainbow International 
Founded in 2012, and headquartered in London, Micro Rainbow International (MRI) is a community interest company and a not for profit social enterprise addressing the specific situation of poverty of lesbian, gay, bisexual, transgender and intersex (LGBTI) people.

MRI believes:
 Many LGBTI people worldwide are poor because of their sexual orientation, gender identity, or intersex status. 
 LGBTI people trapped in poverty can break the poverty cycle if they are given the opportunity.
 Addressing poverty could, and should, change social attitudes towards sexual orientation, gender identity, and intersex status. 
MRI devises tools and makes recommendations as to how poverty can be alleviated for LGBTI people. The Guardian (UK) named MRI one of 2014's top Twitter influences on sexuality and development.

International Lesbian, Gay, Bisexual, Transgender and Intersex Association 
From 2010-12, Rocca served as executive director of the world federation of LGBTI organisations known as ILGA. Under his leadership, ILGA re-obtained ECOSOC status at the United Nations (UN), doubled its budget and membership, and opened a representation office in Geneva, Switzerland. In addition to managing projects in Latin America, Asia, and Africa, Sebastian lobbied the UN, while working closely with government officials and grassroots organisations alike.  ILGA was one of two recipients of a World Pride Award (the other recipient was former United States Secretary of State Hillary Clinton) at the 2012 WorldPride in London.

United Kingdom Lesbian and Gay Immigration Group 
Sebastian's stint (2006–09) with the UK Lesbian & Gay Immigration Group (UKLGIG) was his first as an executive director. With him at the helm UKLGIG was awarded the Black LGBT Community Award by UK Black Pride and Stonewall's Community Group of the Year  in 2008.

Education 
Sebastian Rocca holds a MSc in Economics (2003) from the prestigious Bocconi University in Milan, Italy and a MSc in Poverty Reduction and Development Management (2005) from the University of Birmingham in England.

References 

British LGBT rights activists
Living people
Year of birth missing (living people)